Kitseküla railway station is a railway station in the Kitseküla sub-district of Tallinn, the capital city of Estonia. It is located in central Tallinn, where the Tallinn–Narva railway crosses the road Pärnu maantee, and close to the East Tallinn Central Hospital and the Lilleküla Stadium. The station opened on 10 November 2008.

Kitseküla railway station is served by Express trains from Tallinn Baltic Station which stop at Kitseküla on their way to Tartu and Narva, as well as commuter trains to stations on the line to Aegviidu. All trains are operated by the national passenger train operating company, Elron.

See also
 List of railway stations in Estonia
 Rail transport in Estonia

References

External links

 Official website of Eesti Raudtee (EVR) – the national railway infrastructure company of Estonia  responsible for most of the Estonian railway network
 Official website of Elron – the national passenger train operating company of Estonia operating all domestic passenger train services

Railway stations in Estonia
Transport in Tallinn

